The Sikorsky S-7 was a Russian single engine experimental prototype aircraft built by the Russian Baltic Railroad Car Works shortly after Igor Sikorsky became chief engineer of the aircraft manufacturing division.

Design and development
The S-7 was two-seater wire-braced monoplane powered by a  Gnome air-cooled rotary engine. Construction began in early summer of 1912 and completed in July. The pilot sat in the rear cockpit with a passenger seated in a forward compartment in a tandem arrangement. The fuselage was enclosed in plywood and the aircraft used components taken from the S-6A including the main wing, tail and landing gear.

Operational history
The S-7 was entered in the international military competition at Saint Petersburg in August 1912. During a take-off attempt from a furrowed field the landing gear was severely damaged and the S-7 was unable to finish the completion. In 1913 the aircraft was repaired and served as a trainer. In 1914 Bulgaria purchased the S-7 and used it in operations during World War I.

Specifications

References

S-7
Single-engined tractor aircraft
Mid-wing aircraft
Aircraft first flown in 1912
Rotary-engined aircraft